The Byzantine house  is a former synagogue in the Jesmond neighbourhood of Newcastle upon Tyne, in northeast England.  It was originally conceived as a branch of the Leazes Park Synagogue for families who had moved out of the city centre, but eventually founded in 1914 as an independent congregation.

The synagogue, on Eskdale Terrace in Jesmond, was built in 1914–15 by Marcus Kenneth Glass in an Art Deco interpretation of Byzantine Revival style.

The porch has a triple arcade and columns with lotus bud capitals.  A large, sunburst, stained-glass window fills the huge Byzantine arch of the facade.  The brickwork is coursed with alternating beige and red stripes.

The synagogue was closed in 1986. The exterior has been carefully conserved; the interior was gutted and renovated for use as a school.  It formed part of the Newcastle High School for Girls until 2016, when approval was granted for its conversion into flats.

A commemorative plaque marking the building's previous use as a synagogue was unveiled in July 2019.

References

External links
Jesmond Hebrew Congregation on Jewish Communities and Records – UK (hosted by jewishgen.org).

Former synagogues in England
Art Deco synagogues
Byzantine Revival synagogues
Religion in Tyne and Wear
Buildings and structures in Newcastle upon Tyne